Belton is an unincorporated community located in Muhlenberg County, Kentucky, United States.

History
Belton was formerly called Yost; the original name was in honor of a local family, and the present name is also local in origin, for the Bell family. A post office called Yost was established in 1883, and the name was changed to Belton in 1926.

Geography
The community is located in the southeastern portion of Muhlenberg County at the junction of U.S. Route 431 and Kentucky Route 2270.

References

Unincorporated communities in Muhlenberg County, Kentucky
Unincorporated communities in Kentucky